Nossa Senhora de Lourdes is a municipality located in the Brazilian state of Sergipe. Its population was 6,496 (2020) and its area is 80 km2.

References

Municipalities in Sergipe